"The Line" is a song by British singer-songwriter Raye. It was released on 19 May 2017 via Polydor Records.

Background
In an interview by PopBuzz, when asked about the inspo behind 'The Line', Raye said "I remember being in the line for a club a few years back and I had my favourite trainers on and a t-shirt and it took me ages to get ready. I was queued up for ages and then the bouncer at the door was like "no, you're not coming in". So I was so upset...and then I kinda looked around and I saw the females in the club world, the way girls are expected to dress and behave, it's just so outdated and so boring. Like you have to wear heels and dresses and look really formal and blah, blah, blah. So I was really upset about it so I wrote the song, that's kinda the inspiration behind it."

"Going out clubbing gives you a cold dose of the expectation society has on women," said Raye, in an interview by The Fader magazine. "To get into a club you have to kill yourself in heels, drown in makeup with a tight dress, maybe a bit of cleavage will help you out too. Me going as 'myself,' wearing what I wanted, didn’t cut it. You have to fit within the boundaries and expectations put on you. Watching all these casually dressed men waltzing past me in the queue really pissed me off, so I wrote this tune."

In another interview by Clash magazine, Raye wrote in a text message "'The Line: is/was literally the story of my life."

Track listing

Credits and personnel
Credits adapted from Tidal.
 Raye – composer, lyricist, vocalist
 Alex Gibson – composer, lyricist
 Jamie Bell – composer, lyricist
 Fred Gibson – composer, lyricist, producer
 Ed Phillips – composer, lyricist
 Mark 'Spike' Stent – mixer

Charts

Release history

References

2017 singles
2017 songs
Songs written by Raye (singer)
Polydor Records singles
Raye (singer) songs
Songs written by Alex Gibson (music producer)
Songs written by Fred Again